Phaedrotettix is a genus of spur-throated grasshoppers in the family Acrididae. There are at least 4 described species in Phaedrotettix.

Species
 Phaedrotettix accola (Scudder, 1897)
 Phaedrotettix concinnus (Scudder, S.H., 1897)
 Phaedrotettix dumicola (Scudder, 1878)
 Phaedrotettix palmeri (Scudder, S.H., 1897)

References

 Capinera J.L, Scott R.D., Walker T.J. (2004). Field Guide to Grasshoppers, Katydids, and Crickets of the United States. Cornell University Press.
 Otte, Daniel (1995). "Grasshoppers [Acridomorpha] C". Orthoptera Species File 4, 518.

Further reading

 

Melanoplinae